Patten may refer to:

Patten (surname)
patten (band), London-based electronic music group
Patten (shoe), protective footwear similar to clogs
Patten University, Christian liberal arts university in Oakland, California, United States

Places
Patten River, a tributary of the Turgeon River in Canada
Patten, Georgia, an unincorporated community in the United States
Patten, Maine, a town in the United States
Patten (CDP), Maine, the main settlement in the town

See also
Patton (disambiguation)
Van Patten
Paten, a small plate used to hold bread at the Eucharist